The Isuzu Trooper is a full-size SUV that was produced by the Japanese automaker Isuzu between 1981 and 2007. In the domestic Japanese market it was sold as the Isuzu Bighorn, the car was exported internationally mainly as a Trooper but it also received several other nameplates including Acura SLX, Chevrolet Trooper, Subaru Bighorn, SsangYong Korando Family, Honda Horizon, Opel Monterey, Vauxhall Monterey, Holden Jackaroo, and Holden Monterey.

In total, there were two generations of this vehicle: the first, produced between 1981 and 1991; and the second (UBS) produced between 1991 and 2007, with a substantial refresh in 1998. Production ended in 2007.

The Trooper began as a rather basic and somewhat underpowered on- and off-road vehicle, offered only with four-cylinder motor, four-speed manual transmission, and part-time four-wheel drive. The first generation evolved to add both amenities and luxuries, including optional air-conditioning, power windows, and a more powerful V6 engine. The second generation was even more refined and available in two-wheel drive as well as four-wheel drive.

First generation (1981–1991) 

The first-generation Trooper, introduced in 1981, was available as a three-door wagon or a soft top with independent front suspension. The soft-top model sold slowly and did not last long. In the Japanese market, the car was originally introduced as the "Isuzu Rodeo Bighorn", but the "Rodeo" part of the name was soon dropped. Early engines included a 1.95-liter gasoline and a  2.2-liter diesel, lightly powered even by early-1980s standards for the vehicle's  empty weight. The four-wheel-drive system was engaged by operating a three-position shifter adjacent to the transmission shifter. Both Aisin manual-locking and Isuzu's own auto-locking hubs were employed.

In 1983, Isuzu introduced the five-door version and the 4ZD1 four-cylinder engine  2.3-liter petrol engine. Apart from higher power, changes to the previous engine included a Kevlar timing belt replacing the previous chain, and a larger two-barrel carburetor. This engine eventually proved somewhat problematic with a high incidence of burned valves due to poor coolant-flow design of the overhead cam/valve head with mechanical lifters. A later head casting improvement by an Italian firm corrected this problem through improved coolant flow. Also available only for 1986 in the US was the  2.2-liter C223T turbocharged diesel engine, using a Garrett turbocharger. It was not a popular option because of the low power generated, and furthermore is notorious for a weak bottom end, the connecting rods not originally designed for the increased thermal and mechanical stress of forced induction. Because of those problems, Isuzu North America changed to the larger 4ZE1 four-cylinder petrol unit for 1988 and used the standard 2.8-liter GM V6 for 1989 until their own new V6 engines could be manufactured.

In 1987, the rectangular headlights were introduced, and LS trim was available for the five doors. For 1988, the 4ZD1 (2.3-liter) engine was upgraded to 110 hp, and introduced a  2.6-liter (4ZE1) I-TEC fuel-injected engine for the US market. In 1989, an optional General Motors 2.8-liter pushrod V6 borrowed from the Chevrolet S-10 pickup was also available. Later first-generation models offered an optional four-speed automatic transmission with the 4 cylinders getting a Aisin A340H and the V6s getting a GM 4L30E. Models from 1988 to 1991 were equipped with live rear axles and four-wheel disc brakes.

Overseas model engines included the Isuzu C223 (2,238 cc), C223T (a turbocharged version of the same) and in the late 1980s naturally aspirated and turbocharged 2.8-liter 4JB1 diesel versions, all straight-four engines. 

In 1989 only, a short-wheelbase (90-inch) Isuzu Trooper was imported to the US market as the Trooper RS. All of these short wheelbase Troopers were equipped with 2.6-liter fuel-injected inline-four engines, 4.77:1 differential gears and 15×7-inch aluminium alloy "snowflake" pattern wheels. Automatic and manual transmissions were offered.

In Central America, Troopers were offered with removable roofs and a higher wheel clearance. Powertrain options included the Isuzu 2.8-liter turbo diesel. The Trooper was also sold in Australia and New Zealand as the Holden Jackaroo, named after the Australian term for a young man working on a sheep or cattle station. The standard Trooper was also sold under the Isuzu nameplate in New Zealand only. In Indonesia, where it was locally assembled by Garmak Motors, it was sold as the Chevrolet Trooper. 

Around 1987 a two-wheel-drive version called the Chevrolet Stallion was developed there; it has the Trooper's body on the chassis of a rear-wheel-drive Chevrolet LUV. It also has a rigid front axle instead of the Trooper's independent design. There was also a locally developed SUV model of the Isuzu Pickups built in the early 1980s called the Holden Lincah and Holden Raider. While similar to a Trooper in many ways it was a simpler vehicle and has bodywork partially made of fibreglass. In Venezuela was known as Caribe 442.

In 1988, SsangYong Motors started licensed production of the Isuzu Trooper and sold it as the Korando Family. It was only marketed in South Korea, Scandinavia, Southeast Asia and to a lesser degree South America. It used the same 2.2-liter diesel engine (Korean-built units being called "DC23" rather than C223) but as of September 1991 the naturally aspirated Peugeot 2.5-liter XD3P diesel engine also became available. Isuzu's fuel injected 2.6-liter petrol engine was also installed, beginning in July 1991. 

In August 1994 the Korando Family received a facelift, becoming the "New Family" in the process. This also meant that all previous engine options were replaced by a 2.3-liter Mercedes-Benz OM601 diesel engine. The Family was discontinued in 1996, as the next generation Korando was presented.

Second generation (1991–2007)  

In 1991 for the 1992 model year, Isuzu completely redesigned the Trooper to keep pace with changes in the SUV marketplace, making it larger, more powerful, and more luxurious. A SOHC 3.2-liter engine producing  was introduced in 1996, replacing the earlier DOHC engine in selected export markets. Most models still used a part-time four-wheel-drive system, which required stopping the vehicle to engage and disengage the front axle. Starting in model year 1996, some Troopers came with a "shift-on-the-fly" engagement system.

It was offered as a more rugged and fuel-efficient option for towing and heavy-duty operation, relative to the standard 3.2-liter petrol. The diesel-powered Jackaroo was available with a five-speed manual transmission and manual front hubs only coupled to a part-time four-wheel drive system with open front and limited slip rear differentials. The 3.2-liter V6 petrol engine version was also available with an optional four-speed automatic transmission with automatic locking front hubs. The same diesel engine was also available in the UK and other markets with a belt-driven overhead camshaft, which developed slightly more power. After 1998, and the introduction of the "4JX1" 3.0-liter diesel engine, a four-speed automatic transmission was made available in addition to the five-speed manual transmission.

The Australian version of the UBS-series was sold as the Holden Jackaroo/Monterey. In July 1993, Holden Special Vehicles also launched 79 HSV Jackaroo models, which were just a cosmetic upgrade to Holden donor powered by the same 3.2-liter  (SOHC) petrol engine. 

Around the same period, General Motors, Isuzu and Honda established a working relationship that saw the two-box design of the 5-door Trooper designed by GM with Honda providing petrol engine options and Isuzu providing diesel engine options. Under this partnership the Trooper was thus sold in Japan as the Honda Horizon (1994 to 1999), in Europe as the Opel Monterey, in the United Kingdom as the Vauxhall Monterey (19941998), in Australia as the Holden Jackaroo (19982002), and in the United States as the Acura SLX (1996 to 1999). The Trooper received a mid-life facelift in 1998 with new grille, bumper, headlamps, and front fenders. The rear received a body-colored, hard spare-tire cover.

The 1998 Australasian and US-spec Trooper became equipped with the DOHC 3.5-liter engine from the Isuzu/Holden Rodeo producing . European and Asian buyers could opt for the diesel engine option of the 4JG2 3.1-liter (later superseded by the 4JX1 3.0-liter of ). A Borg-Warner torque-on-demand ("TOD") all-wheel-drive system was introduced, along with freshened styling. The grille was redesigned again for the 2000 model year.

Transmission options included a five-speed manual transmission, the Aisin AR5 and the electronically controlled 4L30E four-speed automatic. The 4l30E was fitted with both a "power" shift feature allowing the gearbox to take better advantage of the engine's power by adjusting the shifting nature and a "winter" mode permitting third gear starts for added stability in slippery conditions. The 2000 to 2002 Trooper included a feature called "Grade Logic" which allowed the transmission to automatically downshift on steep grades in order to slow the vehicle down.

The suspension consisted of a fully independent torsion bar front suspension, and a multilink coil sprung rear suspension integrated with a solid rear axle.

While US-spec Troopers came only equipped with five seats, elsewhere in the world a seven-seater version was also offered. Optional on all models was a rear limited slip differential. In the US the three-door RS model was sold only from 1993 to 1995. The Trooper LS and S models offered  cargo space, while Limited models had .

In 2002, the Trooper was discontinued in the United States in favor of the smaller Axiom and the larger GM-produced Isuzu Ascender, a rebadged GMC Envoy.

A Trooper with the 16-valve  3.0-liter 4JX1-TC engine was sold in the Philippines from 2002 until model year 2005. Known as the Skyroof Edition, it came in a rear-wheel-drive configuration with anti-lock brakes, a limited slip differential, billet-type radiator grille, and large power moonroof. Other standard options included leather seats, wood trim, and a VCD entertainment system. It was later succeeded by the Isuzu Alterra.

Acura SLX 

The "Acura SLX" was a lightly upgraded and rebadged Isuzu Trooper sold by the Acura division of Honda from 1995 to 1999, as 1996 to 1999 year models. Sold only in the United States, the SLX was later replaced by the Acura MDX in 2001.

The SLX omitted some of the options available on Troopers from concurrent model years, including the manual transmission and certain engines. From 1996 to 1997 the SLX was only available with the 3.2-liter SOHC or DOHC V6 engine, switching to the new 3.5-liter DOHC V6 engine in 1998. The SLX received a restyled front end for the 1998 model year, but continued to sell poorly and was ultimately discontinued after 1999. It is said that sales were affected by bad press when the 1996 to 1997 models were rated "Not Acceptable" by Consumer Reports for their tendency to roll over during testing (see Rollover Controversy, below). Autotrader says it has a 3-star safety rating (Front and Passenger) and the base entry price was $36,300.

Monterey 
In Europe, the Trooper/Big Horn was sold as an Opel from 1992 to 1999. Called the Monterey, the plate lasted until 1999 on the continent (as an Opel) and from 1994 to 1998 in Great Britain, where the Vauxhall badge was used, but it was not a strong seller and was withdrawn from sale a year before the Opel version on the continent. The Monterey name also saw use by Holden in Australia, at first (from 1994) as the top equipment level (V6 only) for what was there called the Jackaroo, but later as a standalone nameplate for the more luxurious part of the range.

Rollover controversy 
The second-generation Trooper received negative press in the United States when the 1995–1997 models were rated "Not Acceptable" by Consumer Reports for an alleged tendency to roll over under testing. 

In response to a petition from the publication's publisher, Consumers Union, the National Highway Traffic Administration conducted its own tests and found no issue that could lead to a need for a recall. However, Isuzu suggested that the magazine's claims had hurt sales of the vehicle.

After the release of the NHTSA report, Isuzu filed a lawsuit against Consumers Union seeking $242 million in damages, claiming that during Consumer Reports's tests the steering wheel had been twisted more sharply than "a driver is willing or able to make in response to an unexpected event. 

The judge in the suit, Richard Paez, determined that because Isuzu had engaged in an extensive public relations campaign to refute the claims prior to filing suit, it was considered a public figure, raising the standard for defamation from a simple preponderance of evidence that the report was false to "clear and convincing evidence" that Consumer Reports published the article knowing it was false or with reckless disregard for whether it was true or false. 

The defamation suit went to a jury, which found that eight of the 17 statements in the report questioned by Isuzu were false, with one displaying "reckless disregard" for the truth on the part of Consumer Reports magazine, but that Isuzu was not damaged by that statement. Two of the ten jurors on the panel did not believe the magazine believed that the other seven statements were untruthful when they published them. Consequently, the full jury panel did not award Isuzu monetary damages for the alleged damage to its reputation and lost sales. 

Isuzu calculated the total cost of the Consumer Reports claims at $244 million. As Isuzu was denied damages on all counts, the formal court judgement in favor of Consumers Union entered by Paez required Isuzu to pay CU's "reasonable costs" of defending itself against the suit, not including attorney's fees.

Motorsport 
 1989 – Jackaroo SWB won the Marathon class victory in '89 Australian Safari.
 1992 – Trooper won class victory in '92 Australian Safari.
 1993 – Troopers took first and second place in the class of '93 Australian Safari.
 1994 – Trooper won the Marathon class victory at the 1994 Paris–Dakar Rally.
 1994 – Trooper finished first in its class at the Pharaoh's Rally.

Naming conventions 
 North America – Isuzu Trooper II (1983–1991), Isuzu Trooper (1991–2002), sold by Honda as Acura SLX (from 1996 to 2000)
 South America and Africa – Isuzu Trooper and Chevrolet Trooper
 Colombia – Chevrolet Trooper (First Generation), Chevrolet Trooper 960 (Second generation)
 Venezuela – Caribe 442
 Asia – Isuzu Trooper, also sold by Chevrolet as Chevrolet Trooper
 Japan – Isuzu Bighorn, Subaru Bighorn, sold by Honda as Honda Horizon (similar to the 1995-1999 Acura SLX, introduced in 1994, discontinued in 1999)
 Europe – Isuzu Trooper (1st and 2nd Generation) and Vauxhall Monterey (UK, 1992–1998), Opel Monterey (the rest of Europe and Ireland, 1992–1999)
 New Zealand – Isuzu Bighorn, Isuzu Trooper, Holden Jackaroo, Holden Monterey
 Australia – Holden Jackaroo, Holden Monterey

References

External links 

Bighorn
All-wheel-drive vehicles
Cars introduced in 1981
1990s cars
2000s cars
Mid-size sport utility vehicles
Police vehicles
Rear-wheel-drive vehicles
Cars discontinued in 2007